Joshua Furno (born 21 October 1989) is an Italian rugby union player who plays Lock for Zebre Parma in United Rugby Championship. He also represents Italy as a member of the Italian national team.

Career
Raffaele Joshua Furno was born in Australia but grew up in Italy in the southern town of Benevento. He began his career with Viadana, then played with successor team Aironi in the Pro12 before their dissolution in 2012. 

He then moved to RC Narbonne in the French second division. Furno signed for Biarritz Olympique who compete in the Top 14 during the 2013-14 season. After the experience with Biarritz, on 14 May 2014, Furno moved to England to sign for Newcastle Falcons in the Aviva Premiership ahead of the 2014-15 and 2015-16 seasons. In 2016−2017 season, he played for Zebre in the Pro12.
After the experience with Otago and Wellington in New Zealand and San Diego Legion in United States, in 2022 he came back in France in order to play for Bressane in ProD2. 

In 2008 and 2009 Furno was named in the Italy Under 20 squad and in 2011 he was part of Emerging Italy squad.
He made his test debut with Italian national team as a substitute in a 13–6 win against Scotland in the 2012 Six Nations Championship. 

On 22 February 2014, he scored his first try for Italy in a Six Nations defeat to Scotland, and was subsequently named Man of the Match. On 24 August 2015, he was named in the final 31-man squad for the 2015 Rugby World Cup.

References

External links
Newcastle Falcons Profile
It's Rugby England Profile

1989 births
Living people
Aironi players
Australian emigrants to Italy
Australian expatriate rugby union players
Australian expatriate sportspeople in England
Australian expatriate sportspeople in France
Australian expatriate sportspeople in the United States
Biarritz Olympique players
Expatriate rugby union players in England
Expatriate rugby union players in France
Expatriate rugby union players in the United States
Italian expatriate rugby union players
Italian expatriate sportspeople in England
Italian expatriate sportspeople in France
Italian expatriate sportspeople in the United States
Italian rugby union players
Italy international rugby union players
Newcastle Falcons players
Otago rugby union players
RC Narbonne players
Rugby union flankers
Rugby union locks
Rugby union players from Melbourne
Rugby Viadana players
San Diego Legion players
Wellington rugby union players
Zebre Parma players
Union Sportive Bressane players
Sportspeople from Benevento
Italian expatriate sportspeople in New Zealand
Expatriate rugby union players in New Zealand